List of Fort Hood shooting victims may refer to:

 , victims of a shooting in November 2009
 Victims of the 2014 Fort Hood shootings, a shooting in April 2014